Charles M. McGowan (November 13, 1923 – May 26, 2013) was an American businessman and politician.
Born in Boston, Massachusetts, McGowan served in the United States Army during World War II. He received his bachelor's and master's degrees from Framingham State University and was a real estate appraiser and broker. He served on the Dedham, Massachusetts Board of Selectmen and was chairman. In this capacity he served on the Blue Ribbon Commission honoring John Andrew Barnes, III, the Congressional Medal of Honor recipient.

He then served in the Massachusetts House of Representatives 1967–1978 as a Democrat. He then served as sergeant at arms for the Massachusetts House of Representatives 1978–1988. He died in Dedham, Massachusetts.

Notes

1923 births
2013 deaths
Politicians from Boston
Framingham State University alumni
Businesspeople from Boston
Dedham, Massachusetts selectmen
Democratic Party members of the Massachusetts House of Representatives
Military personnel from Massachusetts
20th-century American businesspeople
United States Army personnel of World War II